Albert Raymond Krevis (born July 9, 1952) is a former American football player. During his career, he played at offensive tackle. Krevis played in 13 games; ten for the New York Jets and three for the Cincinnati Bengals. He earned All-America, All-East, and All-New England honors twice while playing in college.

Early life
Krevis was born in Providence, Rhode Island and attended Morris Catholic High School in New Jersey followed by Boston College. Krevis statistically only showed his talent in college.

Sport career
While playing for the Boston College Eagles football team, Krevis lettered. He was drafted by the Cincinnati Bengals in the 2nd round, 39th overall in the 1975 NFL Draft, and played three games for them. In 1976, he played ten games for New York Jets.

Later life
In 1991, he was inducted into the Boston College Varsity Club Athletic Hall of Fame.

References

American football tackles
1952 births
Players of American football from Providence, Rhode Island
New York Jets players
Cincinnati Bengals players
Boston College Eagles football players
Living people